is a railway station on the Muroran Main Line in Date, Hokkaido, Japan, operated by Hokkaido Railway Company (JR Hokkaido).

Lines
Datemombetsu Station is served by the Muroran Main Line, and is numbered "H38".

Adjacent stations

History
Datemombetsu Station opened on 20 August 1925. With the privatization of Japanese National Railways (JNR) on 1 April 1987, the station came under the control of JR Hokkaido.

Passenger statistics
In fiscal 2011, the station was used by an average of 1,219 passengers daily. The passenger figures for previous years are as shown below.

See also
 List of railway stations in Japan

References

Stations of Hokkaido Railway Company
Railway stations in Hokkaido Prefecture
Railway stations in Japan opened in 1925